Eucalyptus macarthurii, commonly known as the Camden woollybutt or Paddy's river box, is a species of medium-sized tree that is endemic to a small area of New South Wales. It has rough, fibrous bark on the trunk and larger branches, smooth above, narrow lance-shaped to curved adult leaves, flower buds in groups of seven, white flowers and small conical to bell-shaped fruit.

Description
It has rough, greyish brown, fissured, fibrous bark on the trunk and branches, smooth grey bark that is shed in short ribbons on the thinner branches.

Taxonomy and naming
Eucalyptus macarthurii was first formally described in 1899 by Henry Deane and Joseph Maiden in Proceedings of the Linnean Society of New South Wales. The specific epithet (macarthurii) honours "Sir William Macarthur, who appears to have been the first to recognise this particular Woolly-butt as a distinct tree".

Distribution and habitat
Camden woollybutt grows in open forest on flats and near watercourses on the Central and Southern Tablelands between the Blue Mountains and Goulburn.

Conservation status
This eucalypt is classified as "endangered" under the Australian Government Environment Protection and Biodiversity Conservation Act 1999 and the New South Wales Government Biodiversity Conservation Act 2016. The main threats to the species are habitat loss due to land clearing, weed invasion and grazing.

Uses
In the past, this species was commercially harvested for geranyl acetate, which was extracted from the bark using distillation.

References

macarthurii
Myrtales of Australia
Flora of New South Wales
Plants described in 1899
Taxa named by Henry Deane (engineer)
Taxa named by Joseph Maiden